An election to Limerick County Council took place on 11 June 2004 as part of that year's Irish local elections. 28 councillors were elected from five electoral divisions by PR-STV voting for a five-year term of office.

Results by party

Results by Electoral Area

Bruff

Castleconnell

Kilmallock

Newcastle West

Rathkeale

External links

2004 Irish local elections
2004